is a Japanese football player. He played for Blaublitz Akita.

Club statistics
Updated to 20 February 2017.

Honours
 Blaublitz Akita
 J3 League (1): 2017

References

External links

Profile at Blaublitz Akita

1993 births
Living people
Sendai University alumni
People from Odawara
Association football people from Kanagawa Prefecture
Japanese footballers
J3 League players
Blaublitz Akita players
Association football forwards